Swami Mukundananda  (born December 19, 1960) is a spiritual leader, best selling author, Vedic scholar, and authority on mind management. He is the founder of JKYog (Jagadguru Kripaluji Yog) India, a non-profit organization based in Cuttack, Odisha and JKYog, a nonprofit organization based in Dallas, Texas, which offers a unique Yogic system, also known as Yoga for the Body, Mind and Soul.

Biography

Early life and education 

As a child, Swami Mukundananda spent long hours in meditation and contemplation. He received a postgraduate degree from the IIM Calcutta. Afterwards, he joined the order of Sannyas, dedicating his time to devotional pursuits and travelled throughout India as a Sanyasi.  Under the guidance of guru Jagadguru Shree Kripaluji Maharaj, Mukundananda studied the Vedic scriptures,

JKYog

Teachings and philosophy 
Swami Mukundananda formulated JKYog, a system of yoga that incorporates elements of both Hatha yoga and Bhakti yoga, and founded a nonprofit organization of the same name to promote the practice throughout the United States and India. JKYog is headquartered at the Radha Krishna Temple in Allen, Texas. In May 2020, Swami Mukundananda launched the expansion of JKYog activities beyond USA to many major cities across the globe. Swami Mukundananda is a vegetarian and advocates a non-flesh diet to facilitate spiritual growth.

He has been invited to speak at various institutions namely Google, Oracle, Yahoo, Verizon, M.D. Anderson Cancer Center, United Nations, Stanford University, Princeton University, MIT, Kellogg School of Management and Duke University.

Temples and Congregation centres 

Swami Mukundananda travels to many cities in United States and India every year to conduct week-long programs that incorporate  yoga sessions, meditation sessions and spiritual discourses.

He has founded the Radha Krishna temple of Dallas in Allen, Texas.

Jagadguru Kripalu University 

The government of Odisha approved the Jagadguru Kripalu University in April 2018.  Swami Mukundananda is the president of the university, which is presently under construction.  In the first phase, the university will offer higher learning in Sanskrit, Yoga, Naturopathy, Health Administration, Philosophy, Religion and Comparative Religion.

Recent engagement 

Due to the COVID-19 situation, in 2020 Swami Mukundananda conducted an online event to celebrate the International Day of Yoga (June 20–26, 2020), where over 100 sessions were organized including yoga, pranayama, holistic health, health and wellness seminars and workshops.

Swami Mukundananda was distinguished speaker at his alma mater IIT Delhi for Diamond jubilee celebrations.

Swami Mukundananda Ji, was one of the speakers in Bhagavad Gita Summit (from 10th - 14th December 2021) during Gita Jayanti at Dallas, Texas, US along with other notable personalities such as Dr. Menas Kafatos, Mr. Shiv Khera, Kiran Bedi, Brahmacharini Gloria Arieira, Dantu Muralikrishna and others.

The Science of Mind Management 

In 2020, Swami Mukundananda authored his second book on mind management, called The Science of Mind Management. It explains that the quality of our mind determines the quality of the life we lead. The mind can be our greatest ally or our worst adversary. A mind that runs amok could steal our inner peace and undermine our every productive endeavor. Yet, with proper knowledge, training and discipline, it is possible to unleash the mind's infinite potential.

He charts the four different aspects of the human mind and lays down a clear path towards mastering it.  Through witty anecdotes, real-life accounts and stories from the Vedic scriptures, he gently guides readers on the road to winning their inner battle.

The book was ranked second in the Hindustan Times Nielsen's bestseller list.

Selected publications 

 7 Divine Laws to Awaken Your Best Self  (2020)
 The Science of Mind Management: With Proper Knowledge, Training, and Discipline, it is Possible to Unleash the Mind's Infinite Potential  (2020)
 7 Mindsets for Success, Happiness and Fulfilment (English)  (2019)
 Science of Healthy Diet  (2017)
 Bhagavad Gita: The Song of God  (2013)
 Essence of Hinduism: Principles of Hindu philosophy and Traditions: A Summary of the Vedic Scriptures  (2011)
 Spiritual Dialectics: Answers to Some of the Challenging Questions on Spirituality  (2011)
 Yoga for the Body, Mind and Soul: Comprehensive book on Yogasans, Pranayams, Subtle body relaxation, Meditation  (2011)
 Inspiring Stories for Children, Vol. 1:  (2010)
 Inspiring Stories for Children, Vol. 2:  (2010)
 Inspiring Stories for Children, Vol. 3:  (2010)
 Inspiring Stories for Children, Vol. 4:  (2010)
 Bal-Mukund Festivals of India: All Major Festivals of India and their Spiritual, Cultural and Religious Significance  (2010)
 Bal-Mukund Wisdom Book: Noble Values for Children's Personality Development: Verses and Chants for Children to Learn  (2010)
 Bal-Mukund Saints of India: Great saints of India and their Influence on Society  (2010)

Gallery

References

External links 
  of Swami Mukundananda
 "Swami Mukundananda". www.jkyog.org. Retrieved 26 January 2019.

 Swami Mukundananda – A Manual For Life

1960 births
Living people
20th-century Hindu religious leaders
21st-century Hindu religious leaders
Devotees of Krishna
Hindu revivalist writers
Indian Vaishnavites
Translators of the Bhagavad Gita